Scutellaria integrifolia, commonly called helmet flower or helmet skullcap, is a flowering plant in the mint family. It is native to the eastern United States where it is found in openings in mesic, acidic soil. It likely requires disturbance in the form of fire to maintain its appropriate habitat.

Scutellaria integrifolia is identifiable by its narrow, usually entire leaves and densely pubescent stem. It produces a raceme of large blue-purple flowers in late spring through summer.

References

integrifolia
Flora of the Eastern United States
Taxa named by Carl Linnaeus